The Atlantic City Diablos are an American professional soccer team based in Richland, New Jersey, United States. Founded in 2005, the team plays in Women's Premier Soccer League (WPSL), a national amateur league at the fourth tier of the American Soccer Pyramid.

The Diablos' home is the St. Augustine College Preparatory School's athletic stadium, located in the Atlantic City suburb of Richland, where they have played since 2007. The team is owned by Team Dynamics LLC, a highly successful organization dedicated to soccer education and player development at all age levels.  Team Dynamics LLC also maintains a team in the National Premier Soccer League (NPSL), also called the Atlantic City Diablos.  The team's colors are blue, gold, and white.

Year-by-year

Logos

Honors
 WPSL East Mid-Atlantic Division Champions 2007
 WPSL East South Division Champions 2006

Head coaches
 Matt Driver (2006–2008)
 Stuart Gore (2008-2010)

Home stadiums
 St. Augustine College Preparatory School (2008–present)

External links
 Official Site
 WPSL Atlantic City Diablos page

   

Women's Premier Soccer League teams
Women's soccer clubs in the United States
Atlantic City Diablos
2005 establishments in New Jersey
Women's sports in New Jersey